Michael Hayden Armacost (born April 15, 1937) is a retired American diplomat and a fellow at Stanford University's Freeman Spogli Institute. He was acting United States Secretary of State during the early days of the administration of President George H. W. Bush, before Secretary James Baker was confirmed by the Senate. Armacost also served as United States Ambassador to Japan and the president of the Brookings Institution from 1995 to 2002.

Diplomatic career
In the 1960s, Armacost taught international relations and foreign policy at Pomona College.

In January 1977 Armacost was selected as a member of the National Security Council to handle East Asian and Chinese affairs under the Carter administration until July 1978, when he was replaced by Nicholas Platt. Years later he was appointed to be the United States Ambassador to Japan from 1989 to 1993, Under Secretary of State for Political Affairs from 1984 to 1989, and United States Ambassador to the Philippines from 1982 to 1984, during a critical period of political upheaval during the Ferdinand Marcos presidency.

He served as Acting Secretary of State from January 20, 1989, to January 25, 1989. In the interval between 1995 and 2002, Armacost served as president of Washington D.C's Brookings Institution, the nation's oldest think tank and a leader in research on politics, government, international affairs, economics, and public policy.

He has received the President's Distinguished Service Award, the Defense Department's Distinguished Civilian Service Award, and the Secretary of State's Distinguished Services Award.

Armacost is the author of three books, the most recent of which, Friends or Rivals?, was published in 1996 and draws on his tenure as ambassador. He also co-edited, with Daniel Okimoto, The Future of America's Alliances in Northeast Asia, published in 2004 by Shorenstein APARC. Armacost has served on numerous corporate and nonprofit boards, including TRW, AFLAC, Applied Materials, USEC, Inc., Cargill, Inc, Carleton College, and The Asia Foundation.

Armacost received a Bachelor of Arts in international relations from Carleton College in 1958, an honorary degree in 1989, where he was chairman of the board of trustees from 2004 to 2008, and earned his Ph.D. from Columbia University in 1965. He was also an international fellow of the School of International and Public Affairs, Columbia University in 1961.

Armacost is a Fellow of the National Academy of Public Administration.

Honors
 Order of the Rising Sun, Grand Cordon, 2007 (Japan).

References

External links
The Mismatch between Northeast Asian Change and American Distractions, by Michael H. Armacost, NBR Analysis, January 2007

Forging Even Closer Japan-US Ties | Nippon.com

1937 births
Living people
20th-century American diplomats
Place of birth missing (living people)
Acting United States Secretaries of State
Ambassadors of the United States to Japan
Ambassadors of the United States to the Philippines
Brookings Institution people
Carleton College alumni
Columbia Graduate School of Arts and Sciences alumni
Grand Cordons of the Order of the Rising Sun
National Bureau of Asian Research
Pomona College faculty
Stanford University fellows
Under Secretaries of State for Political Affairs
United States National Security Council staffers
White House Fellows